Jai Prakash Mahila College also known as JPM, Chapra is a women's only degree college in Chhapra, Bihar. It is a constituent unit of Jai Prakash University. College offers Intermediate and Three years Degree Course (TDC) in Arts and Science.

History 
College was established in the year 1955.

References

External links 

 Jai Prakash University website 

Colleges in India
Memorials to Jayaprakash Narayan
Constituent colleges of Jai Prakash University
Educational institutions established in 1955
1955 establishments in Bihar